Roger Catroux (17 January 1913 - 3 November 1982) was a French politician.

Catroux was born in Saïda, Algeria. He represented the Republican Party of Liberty (PRL) in the Constituent Assembly elected in 1946.

References

1913 births
1982 deaths
People from Saïda
Pieds-Noirs
Republican Party of Liberty politicians
Members of the Constituent Assembly of France (1946)